Hermann station may refer to:

Hermann station (Missouri), an Amtrak station in Hermann, Missouri
Hermann Park / Rice University (METRORail station), a METRORail station in Houston, Texas
Memorial Hermann Hospital / Houston Zoo (METRORail station), a METRORail station in Houston, Texas

See also
Hermann (disambiguation)